The 1782 Saigon Massacre was a massacre of ethnic Chinese carried out by the Vietnamese Tây Sơn rebels under the leadership of Nguyễn Nhạc in 1782 in the city of Saigon, which is modern-day Ho Chi Minh City. 

During the early phase of the Vietnamese civil war (1771–1802), many Chinese formed a military group called the Hoà Nghĩa army that fought for the Nguyen lord who was the Tây Sơn's enemy. In 1782 the Tây Sơn led by Nguyễn Nhạc launched an attack on Saigon and succeeded in capturing the city. However, one of Nhạc's key lieutenants was killed by an ethnic Chinese general fighting for the Nguyen. Nhạc decided to clean out Chinese settlers in Saigon. Tây Sơn troops burned and pillaged the shops of Chinese merchants and massacred thousands of Chinese residents. This was more generally reflected by Tây Sơn's anger at the increasing support given by the Chinese community to their Nguyen rivals. After this victory, the Tây Sơn leaders returned north in June, leaving the city in the hands of their lieutenants. Chinese civilian death toll ranged from 4,000 to 20,000.

References

Bibliography
  
 
  

Tây Sơn wars
Massacres in 1782
Massacres in Vietnam
China–Vietnam relations
Anti-Chinese violence in Asia
1782 in Vietnam
Hoa people
Saigon
1782 murders in Asia